Luarsab I ( – ), of the Bagrationi dynasty, was a king of the Georgian Kingdom of Kartli from 1527 to 1556 or from 1534 to 1558. Persistent in his resistance against Safavid Persian aggression, he was killed in the Battle of Garisi.

Life
The eldest son of David X, he succeeded on the abdication of his uncle, George IX, in 1527 (more accepted date) or 1534.

When young, he distinguished himself as a commander in his father’s army, particularly at the Battle of Teleti (1522), won by a Persian invasion army in spite of heavy losses. He established close contacts with Bagrat III of Imereti, king of Imereti (western Georgia) and married in 1526 his daughter. A year later, he was crowned king of Kartli and launched a series of measures to strengthen the kingdom’s defence capacity amid the ongoing war between the Safavid Empire and Ottoman Empire (1514-1555). In alliance with Bagrat of Imereti, Luarsab fought both empires trying to preserve his independence and reestablish close cooperation between various Georgian polities. In 1535, Bagrat conquered a pro-Ottoman southern Georgian principality of Samtskhe, granting its province Javakheti to Kartli. The Kartlian-Imeretian alliance was soon joined by another Georgian monarch, Levan I of Kakheti. However, the 1541 invasion by the Persian shah Tahmasp I forced Levan out of a Georgian coalition, it left most of Kartli in ruins, and the capital Tbilisi garrisoned by a Persian force. The year 1545 brought another misfortune: a combined army of the Imeretian and Kartlian kings were crushed by the Ottomans at the Battle of Sokhoista and expelled from Samtskhe. From 1547 to 1554, Kartli suffered three more invasions by Tahmasp of Persia, who overran the country, but failed to force the king into submission. The Treaty of Amasya, 1555, between the Safavids and Ottomans left Georgia divided between these empires, with the east under Persian domination and the west under Turkish control. Luarsab, however, did not recognise the treaty, and continued desperate guerilla war against the Persian occupation forces virtually holding them under siege. In order to subdue the stubborn Georgian monarch, Shah Tahmasp sent Shahverdi Sultan, beglarbeg of Ganja and Karabakh, with a large army. Luarsab and his son, Simon, met the invaders at the Battle of Garisi. A heavy fight resulted in a Georgian victory, but Luarsab was mortally wounded.

Luarsab was buried at the Svetitskhoveli Cathedral at Mtskheta.

Family and children
Luarsab I married on March 25, 1526 Tamar of Imereti, daughter of king Bagrat III of Imereti. They had eight children:
A son, who died in 1536 and was buried at Mtskheta
Simon I, King of Kartli
David XI, King of Kartli
Vakhtang (c. 1546–1605), sometime governor of Akhaldaba and Dirbi. He was married to the certain Tinatin and had had a son, Teimuraz-Mirza, and a daughter, Tamar. Teimuraz-Mirza's son, Luarsab, (died in 1650), was adopted by King Rostom of Kartli as his heir in 1639. Tamar was married to Prince Paremuz Amilakhvari.
Alexander (fl. 1546–1573)
Levan
A daughter, married Kekaoz Chkheidze (fl. 1570–1590). Their son Gorgasal Chkheidze (fl. 1590–1629) was married to a daughter of Giorgi Saakadze. 
A daughter, married Giorgi, son of Levan of Kakheti.

References

External links
Luarsab I  (In Georgian)
 History of Iranian-Georgian relations by Keith Hitchins at Iranica.com

Kings of Kartli
Bagrationi dynasty of the Kingdom of Kartli
1500s births
1550s deaths
Burials at Svetitskhoveli Cathedral
16th-century people from Georgia (country)
Eastern Orthodox monarchs
Monarchs killed in action